Dehnow-e Mohammad Khan (also Romanized as Dehnow-e Moḩammad Khān; also known as Deh-e Now, Dehnow, and Deh Now) is a village in Nakhlestan Rural District, in the Central District of Kahnuj County, Kerman Province, Iran. At the 2006 census, its population was 33, in 7 families.

References 

Populated places in Kahnuj County